Sphodrus is a genus of ground beetle native to the Palearctic (including Europe), the Near East, North Africa and the Oriental region. It contains the following species:

 Sphodrus leucophthalmus Linne, 1758
 Sphodrus trochanteribus Mateu, 1990

References

External links
Sphodrus at Fauna Europaea